Leo Nowak may refer to:
 Leo Nowak (bishop)
 Leo Nowak (artist)

See also
 Leopold Nowak, musicologist